Diego Alessandro Aparecido Sacoman Silva (born 15 December 1986), known as Diego Sacoman, is a Brazilian footballer who plays for Bragantino. Mainly as a central defender, he can also play as a left back.

Club career
Born in Guarulhos, São Paulo, Sacoman joined Corinthians' youth setup in 1993, aged six. In 2008, shortly after being promoted to the main squad, he was loaned to Guarani until the end of the year.

Sacoman appeared rarely with the side, mainly due to injury. He returned to Timão in 2009, making his first team debut on 21 February of that year by starting in a 3–1 Campeonato Paulista away win against Guaratinguetá.

Sacoman made his Série A debut on 6 June 2009, playing the full 90 minutes in a 2–0 home win against Coritiba. He appeared in 20 matches during the season, as his side finished 10th.

On 11 January 2010, Sacoman was loaned to Ceará until December. On 16 May 2011, after being rarely used at Corinthians, he returned to Vozão for a second spell, also in a temporary deal.

On 24 January 2012 Sacoman joined Ponte Preta, on loan until 30 April. On 4 May, after his contract with Corinthians expired, he signed permanently with Ponte until the end of 2014.

On 23 September 2014, after failing a medical at Atlético Paranaense, Sacoman had to retire after having a hypertrophic cardiomyopathy. On 2 February of the following year, however, he returned to action after agreeing to a contract with Santa Cruz.

Career statistics

Honours
Corinthians
Campeonato Paulista: 2009
Copa do Brasil: 2009

Santa Cruz
Campeonato Pernambucano: 2015

References

External links

1986 births
Living people
People from Guarulhos
Brazilian footballers
Association football defenders
Campeonato Brasileiro Série A players
Campeonato Brasileiro Série B players
Sport Club Corinthians Paulista players
Guarani FC players
Ceará Sporting Club players
Associação Atlética Ponte Preta players
Santa Cruz Futebol Clube players
Red Bull Brasil players
Footballers from São Paulo (state)